The Epipaschiinae are a subfamily of snout moths (family Pyralidae). More than 720 species are known today, which are found mainly in the tropics and subtropics. Some occur in temperate regions, but the subfamily is apparently completely absent from Europe, at least as native species. A few Epipaschiinae are crop pests that may occasionally become economically significant.

Description and ecology
Adult females are often hard to distinguish from related lineages, and even the larvae do not possess the characteristic sclerotized bristle base near the start of the abdomen, whose position is a tell-tale mark of the other subfamilies of Pyralidae.

By contrast, the adult males of Epipaschiinae are easier to recognize, and three of their traits support the assumption that Epipaschiinae are a natural, monophyletic group:
 an always upturned and pointed third segment of the labial palpi
 a ventrally curved phallobase of the male which usually extends beyond the ductus ejaculatorius
 the weakly sclerotized tegumen
In addition, in most cases the adult males of this subfamily have a conspicuous scaled projection from the scape of the antennae.

The caterpillar larvae are leaf rollers, leaf tiers and leaf miners. As pests, they infest such diverse plants as Persea americana (avocado), Swietenia (mahoganies), or Zea mays (corn). However, they are usually a mere nuisance and do not cause large-scale crop failure.

Systematics
Alma Solis (1993) provided a phylogenetic analysis of 20 genera of the Pococera complex, consisting of some 300 species in the Western Hemisphere.

Accinctapubes Solis, 1993
Agastophanes Turner, 1937
Anaeglis Lederer, 1863
Anarnatula Dyar, 1918
Anexophana Viette, 1960
Apocera Schaus, 1912 (= Paranatula Dyar, 1913)
Araeopaschia Hampson, 1906 (= Aroeopaschia Amsel, 1956)
Astrapometis Meyrick, 1884
Austropaschia Hampson, 1916
Axiocrita Turner, 1913
Bibasilaris Solis, 1993
Cacozelia Grote, 1878
Calybitia Schaus, 1922
Canipsa Walker, 1866 (= Sarama Moore, 1888, Scopocera Moore, 1888)
Carthara Walker, 1865 (= Leptosphetta Butler, 1878, Pycnulia Zeller, 1881)
Catalaodes Viette, 1953
Catamola Meyrick, 1884 (= Elaphernis Meyrick, 1936)
Cecidipta Berg, 1877 (= Acecidipta Amsel, 1956)
Chloropaschia Hampson, 1906
Coenodomus Walsingham, 1888 (= Alippa Aurivillius, 1894, Dyaria Neumoegen, 1893)
Dasyvesica Solis, 1991
Deuterollyta Lederer, 1863 (= Ajacania Schaus, 1925, Ajocara Schaus, 1925, Oedomia Dognin, 1906, Winona Hulst, 1888)
Doddiana Turner, 1902
Elisabethinia Ghesquière, 1942
Ephedrophila Dumont, 1928
Epilepia Janse, 1931
Epipaschia Clemens, 1860
Eublemmodes Gaede, 1917
Geropaschia Hampson, 1917 (= Araeopaschia Hampson, 1916)
Glossopaschia Dyar, 1914
Heminomistis Meyrick, 1933
Homura Lederer, 1863
Incarcha Dyar, 1910
Isolopha Hampson, 1895 (= Islopha Janse, 1931)
Jocara Walker, 1863 (= Toripalpus Grote, 1878)
Lacalma Janse, 1931
Lameerea Ghesquière, 1942
Lamida Walker, 1859 (= Allata Walker, 1863)
Lepidogma Meyrick, 1890 (= Asopina Christoph, 1893, Precopia Ragonot, 1891)
Lepipaschia J. C. Shaffer & Solis, 1994
Leptoses Ghesquière, 1942
Lista Walker, 1859 (= Belonepholis Butler, 1889, Craneophora Christoph, 1881, Paracme Lederer, 1863)
Locastra Walker, 1859 (= Taurica Walker, 1866)
Macalla Walker, 1859 (= Aradrapha Walker, 1866, Mochlocera Grote, 1876, Pseudomacalla Dognin, 1908)
Mazdacis Solis, 1993
Mediavia Solis, 1993
Micropaschia Hampson, 1906
Milgithea Schaus, 1922 (= Miligithea Neave, 1940)
Mimaglossa Warren, 1891
Neopaschia Janse, 1922
Noctuides Staudinger, 1892 (= Anartula Staudinger, 1893, Arnatula Hampson, 1896, Parorthaga Hampson, 1896)
Nouanda Holland & Schaus, 1925
Nyctereutica Turner, 1904 (= Diastrophica Turner, 1937)
Obutobea Ghesquière, 1942
Odontopaschia Hampson, 1903
Omphalepia Hampson, 1906
Omphalota Hampson, 1899
Oneida Hulst, 1889
Orthaga Walker, 1859 (= Edeta Walker, 1859, Hyperbalanotis Warren, 1891, Pannucha Moore, 1888, Proboscidophora Warren, 1891)
Oxyalcia Dognin, 1905
Pandoflabella Solis, 1993
Parastericta Janse, 1931
Peplochora Meyrick, 1933
Phidotricha Ragonot, 1889 (= Eutrichocera Hampson, 1904, Jocarula Dyar, 1925)
Plumiphora Janse, 1931
Plutopaschia Hampson, 1917
Pococera Zeller, 1848 (= Attacapa Hulst, 1889, Auradisa Walker, 1866, Benta Walker, 1863, Hemimatia Lederer, 1863, Katona Hulst, 1888, Lanthaphe Clemens, 1860, Lanthape Hulst, 1903, Loma Hulst, 1888, Saluda Hulst, 1888, Tetralopha Zeller, 1848, Tioga Hulst, 1888, Afra Ghesquière, 1942, Wanda Hulst, 1888)
Poliopaschia Hampson, 1916
Polylophota Hampson, 1906
Pseudocera Walker, 1863
Quadraforma Solis, 1993
Rhynchopaschia Hampson, 1906
Roeseliodes Warren, 1891
Salma Walker, 1863 (= Calinipaxa Walker, 1866, Enchesphora Turner, 1913, Exacosmia Walker, 1865, Heterobella Turner, 1904, Heterobela Turner, 1904, Orthotrichophora Warren, 1891, Parasarama Warren, 1890, Parasamera Sharp, 1892, Pseudolocastra Snellen, 1890, Pseudolocastra Warren, 1891)
Schoutedenidea Ghesquière, 1942
Sparactica Meyrick, 1938
Spectrotrota Warren, 1891
Speiroceras Chrétien, 1911
Stericta Lederer, 1863 (= Glossina Guenée, 1854, Matalia Walker, 1866, Oncobela Turner, 1937, Phialia Walker, 1866)
Sultania Koçak, 1987
Taiwanastrapometis Shibuya, 1928
Tallula Hulst, 1888
Tancoa Schaus, 1922
Teliphasa Moore, 1888 (= Sultania Koçak, 1987)
Termioptycha Meyrick, 1889 (= Sialocyttara Turner, 1913)
Tineopaschia Hampson, 1916
Titanoceros Meyrick, 1884
Trichotophysa Warren, 1896
Yuma Hulst, 1889

References

  (2011): Epipaschiinae Meyrick Lepidoptera and Some Other Life Forms. Retrieved May 12, 2017.
  (2007): Phylogenetic studies and modern classification of the Pyraloidea (Lepidoptera). Revista Colombiana de Entomología 33(1): 1–8 [English with Spanish abstract]. HTML fulltext

External links

 Macalla thyrsisalis, mahogany webworm at the University of Florida Featured Creatures website
 Pococera robustella, pine webworm at the University of Florida Featured Creatures website

 
Moth subfamilies